The Podasconidae  are a family of marine isopod crustaceans in the suborder Cymothoida. The original description was made by Giard and Bonnier in 1895. Members of this family are parasitic on amphipods.

The family contains these genera and species:

Parapodascon  Hansen, 1916
P. stebbingi  (Giard & Bonnier, 1895)
Podascon  Giard & Bonnier, 1889
P. chevreuxi  Giard & Bonnier, 1895
P. dellavallei  Giard & Bonnier, 1889
P. haploopis  Giard & Bonnier, 1895
P. chevreuxi  Giard & Bonnier, 1893 (nomen nudum)

References

Cymothoida
Crustacean families